Alfredo Baldomir Ferrari (August 27, 1884 – February 25, 1948) was a Uruguayan soldier, architect and politician. He served as President of Uruguay from 1938 to 1943 and is most notable for leading Uruguay to support the Allies during World War II.

Background

Baldomir was born in Montevideo. He joined the army in 1900 and studied architecture and engineering. He designed many famous buildings in Uruguay, eventually directed the army corps of engineers and worked as a professor.

By 1930, Baldomir was becoming involved in politics. He served as chief of police of Montevideo from 1931 to 1934 and as defense minister of Uruguay from 1935 to 1938, and was thus strongly identified with the rule of his brother-in-law, then President of Uruguay Gabriel Terra.

President of Uruguay

He was elected President of Uruguay in 1938 as a member of the long-ruling 
Colorado Party. He took office as President on June 19, 1938; the Vice President of Uruguay during his period of Presidential office was Alfredo Navarro. Baldomir set a high priority in involving Uruguay in international affairs, and appointed the famous diplomat Alberto Guani as foreign minister.

World War II

As World War II broke out (Baldomir was President during the Battle of the River Plate), Baldomir discouraged support for the Axis within the country, and early in 1942, he broke off diplomatic relations with the Axis Powers. In 1942, Baldomir, now a general in the army, expanded his powers through a military coup dissolving parliament and declaring an emergency. His term, which was soon to expire, was extended for a year. Soon a new Constitution came into force.

In 1943, Baldomir voluntarily held elections and gave up power, but the continued dominance of the Colorados was ensured.

Later life
Baldomir retired from presidency on 1 March 1943. He was the president of Banco de la República Oriental del Uruguay from 1943 to 1946.

In 1948 he died of an illness in Montevideo.

Legacy

Baldomir's actions to identity Uruguay with the Allied cause in World War II  have lessened his reputation as a controversial historical figure. It may be noted that he was a leading supporter of the previous President of Uruguay Gabriel Terra, who ruled by decree.

See also
 Constitution of Uruguay of 1942
 Politics of Uruguay

References

1884 births
1948 deaths
People from Montevideo
Uruguayan people of Italian descent
Presidents of Uruguay
Candidates for President of Uruguay
Uruguayan architects
World War II political leaders
Uruguay in World War II
Colorado Party (Uruguay) politicians
Defence ministers of Uruguay
Uruguayan bankers
Uruguayan National Army generals